Malthinus occipitalis, the yellow-tipped soldier beetle, is a species of soldier beetle in the family Cantharidae. It is found in North America.

Subspecies
These three subspecies belong to the species Malthinus occipitalis:
 Malthinus occipitalis atripennis LeConte, 1851
 Malthinus occipitalis occipitalis LeConte, 1881
 Malthinus occipitalis woodruffi Wittmer, 1981

References

Further reading

 

Cantharidae
Articles created by Qbugbot
Beetles described in 1851